The Seaboard–All Florida Railway was a subsidiary of the Seaboard Air Line Railroad that oversaw two major extensions of the system in the early 1920s to southern Florida on each coast during the land boom. One line extended the Seaboard's tracks on the east coast from West Palm Beach down to Fort Lauderdale and Miami (and later, Homestead), while the other extension on the west coast extended the tracks from Fort Ogden south to Fort Myers and Naples, with branches from Fort Myers to LaBelle and Punta Rassa. These two extensions were heavily championed by Seaboard president S. Davies Warfield (who died months after its completion), and were constructed by Foley Brothers railroad contractors. Both extensions also allowed the Seaboard to better compete with the Florida East Coast Railway and the Atlantic Coast Line Railroad, who already served the lower east and west coasts of Florida respectively.

Today, only the east coast route survives and is now the state-owned South Florida Rail Corridor (which notably hosts Tri-Rail and Amtrak service for South Florida) and the Homestead Subdivision, which is still owned by CSX Transportation. The west coast route was removed in 1952 though a few related structures from the line still stand.

Grand opening celebration

The Seaboard–All Florida Railway's west coast route commenced operation on January 7, 1927, and the east coast route began service the following day. On each opening day, President S. Davies Warfield rode aboard a special section of the Seaboard's Orange Blossom Special with a number of special guests and dignitaries including Florida Governor John W. Martin. Dorothy Walker Bush, mother of U.S. President George H. W. Bush was also aboard the first train to Miami. The train stopped at points along the lines for public ovation with nearly 20,000 people attending. The two-day celebration is considered to be one of the largest public relations events in the history of American railroads.

East Coast

Route and history

The Seaboard Air Line Railroad began serving West Palm Beach in January 1925.  Seaboard's line to West Palm Beach, which originated at the their main line in Coleman (just south of Wildwood), was built by the Florida Western and Northern Railroad, another Seaboard Air Line subsidiary.  The Seaboard-All Florida Railway was organized to extend this line south from West Palm Beach to Miami.  When service on the line began, the Seaboard–All Florida Railway from West Palm Beach to Miami (along with track north of West Palm Beach to Coleman) was designated as the Seaboard Air Line Railroad's Miami Subdivision on employee timetables and the extension to Homestead was designated as the Homestead Subdivision.

Upon its completion in January 1927, track ran from West Palm Beach south along a route largely paralleling the Florida East Coast Railway (FEC), which existed a few miles closer to the coast.  The Seaboard line ran just to the west of the central areas of Boynton, Delray, Boca Raton, Deerfield, Fort Lauderdale, and Hollywood.

At Port Everglades Junction just south of Fort Lauderdale, the Port Everglades Belt Line Railroad connected the Seaboard line with Port Everglades, which opened in 1928.  The Port Everglades Belt Line ran east to the port along the current route of Interstate 595.

South of Hollywood, the line turned southwest through Opa-locka before turning back south through Hialeah.  It crossed the Florida East Coast Railway's Little River Branch in Hialeah at a junction that would be named Iris Interlocking. South of Hialeah, the line turned southeast along the Miami Canal toward downtown Miami.  A passenger depot serving Miami was built at 2206 NW 7th Ave in the Allapattah neighborhood.  Track would continue beyond the passenger depot south and east into downtown.  It crossed the FEC's main line near NW 11th Street and connected with the Miami Municipal Railway, which continued the line a short distance to the city docks at Miami's original port (located at the site of Museum Park). 

The Seaboard Air Line ran a number of intercity passenger services to Miami on the line including the Orange Blossom Special, Silver Meteor, Silver Star, the Sunland, the Palmland, and the Cross State Limited.

At Hialeah Junction (located less than a mile south of the Hialeah station), a branch track was also built south over the Miami Canal, where Seaboard built a freight yard and maintenance shops.  The branch crossed the canal on a bascule drawbridge and then turned west at a wye where it entered the yard.  By the end of 1927, the line was extended one last time from the yard southwest to Homestead.  Passenger service ran on the Homestead Subdivision up until 1929, when it was downgraded to a freight-only line.  

The original Hialeah yard and the Homestead Subdivision from the yard to Oleander originally ran though the middle of what is now Miami International Airport.  The yard was located at the east end of the current Runway 8R/26L at the time.  Prior to 1949, the airport was actually two separate air fields on either side of the tracks, with Miami Army Airfield to the south and Pan American Field (later known as the 36th Street Airport) to the north.  In 1949, the Dade County Port Authority merged the two air fields and was officially named Miami International Airport.  The Dade County Port Authority paid $3 million to relocate Seaboard's Hialeah yard to its current location north of Iris Interlocking.  At the same time, the Homestead Subdivision was rerouted to its current alignment between LeJeune Road and Oleander Junction along the Tamiami Canal and the south side of the airport.  In 1958, a spur was built from Oleander Junction west through Doral and Sweetwater to serve a cement plant built by the Lehigh Portland Cement Company.

By 1964, Miami's original port was largely replaced by PortMiami on Dodge Island.  Tracks east of the station to the original port would eventually be removed. 

In 1963, the line began hosting the Atlantic Coast Line Railroad's Miami-bound passenger trains.  The Atlantic Coast Line Railroad was the Seaboard Air Line's main competitor in Central Florida and the West Coast of the state.  This arrangement was quickly made due to the abrupt discontinuation of passenger service on the Florida East Coast Railway, who previously handled the Atlantic Coast Line's Miami trains.  By then, merger talks were underway between the Atlantic Coast Line and the Seaboard Air Line.  The merger would be complete by 1967 and the new combined company would be named the Seaboard Coast Line Railroad.

In 1971, all of the Seaboard Coast Line's intercity passenger service was taken over by Amtrak who still operate to Miami on the line today.  In the 1970s, Interstate 95 was built through South Florida, which was mostly built beside the Seaboard tracks between West Palm Beach and Golden Glades.  Interstate 595 was completed in 1991 and the line was realigned slightly at the former Port Everglades Junction to accommodate the interchange between I-95 and I-595.

In 1980, the Seaboard Coast Line's parent company merged with the Chessie System, creating the CSX Corporation.  The CSX Corporation initially operated the Chessie and Seaboard Systems separately until 1986, when they were merged into CSX Transportation.  

In 1983, the Florida Department of Transportation (FDOT) was looking to start temporary commuter rail service between West Palm Beach and Miami while construction crews widened Interstate 95 and Florida's Turnpike.  The state's original plan was to use the more urban Florida East Coast Railway for the service, but FEC declined to grant access to its line as they wanted freight to be their top priority.  CSX on the other hand was going through a corporate restructuring in 1985 and was seeking to sell or abandon some of its lines.  CSX sold the line from West Palm Beach to Miami Airport in May 1988 to FDOT for $264 million.  Since the sale to FDOT, the line has been officially known as the South Florida Rail Corridor.

Current operations

Tri-Rail service began on the South Florida Rail Corridor in January 1989.  While initially intended to be temporary, it eventually became a permanent service.  CSX continued to maintain and provide dispatching for the line up until 2015, when FDOT took over those responsibilities.  Tri-Rail  extended service south to a new station at Miami Airport located at the end of the wye south of the Miami Canal in 1998.  This was the first passenger service south of the Miami Canal since passenger service was discontinued on the Homestead Subdivision in 1929.  FDOT completed double-tracking the line from West Palm Beach to Hialeah in 2006.  Amtrak continues to operate the Silver Meteor and Silver Star service from New York City to Miami over the line, both of which are former Seaboard passenger services.  Today, the original 1920s Seaboard stations are used by Amtrak and Tri-Rail for service at West Palm Beach, Deerfield Beach, Fort Lauderdale and Hollywood. Though no longer in use, the Seaboard stations at Delray Beach, Opa-locka, Hialeah, and Homestead are still standing. 

CSX continues to have freight trackage rights on the state-owned portion of the line.  The original southern end of the line from Hialeah Junction to Downtown Miami is still owned by CSX and is now their Downtown Spur.  CSX also still owns the Lehigh Spur and the Homestead Subdivision, which is the southernmost trackage of the entire CSX network.

Hialeah yard is still used by CSX, and it also contains a car maintenance facility and locomotive shop for both Amtrak and Tri-Rail. Amtrak's current Miami station, which replaced the original Seaboard Miami depot in Allapattah in 1978, is located at the south end of the yard.

Historic stations

West Coast

Route and history

The Seaboard All-Florida Railway's west coast route began at Hull (just northeast of Fort Ogden), branching off of the Seaboard's recently acquired Charlotte Harbor and Northern Railway, and proceeded directly south in a nearly straight trajectory to Fort Myers. It crossed the Atlantic Coast Line's Lakeland–Fort Myers Line twice en route to Fort Myers: once in Fort Ogden and once at Gilchrist (just northeast of North Fort Myers).  The line connected with a logging railroad operated by the Dowling and Camp Lumber Company near Slater. As the line approached Fort Myers, it crossed the Caloosahatchee River on a long drawbridge just downstream of the original Tamiami Trail Bridge. The pier at Riverside Park in East Fort Myers is located where the bridge crossed the river.

In Fort Myers, the passenger depot was located just south of the river at the intersection of Palm Beach Boulevard (State Road 80) and East Riverside Drive. Henry Ford, a seasonal Fort Myers resident, used the station to reach his winter home (the Edison and Ford Winter Estates) on McGregor Boulevard. Just south of the passenger depot, a separate freight depot (which still stands) was built along on Michigan Avenue.  From there, the line continued south out of the city along Palm Avenue and the west side of the Ten Mile Canal, closely paralleling the Atlantic Coast Line Railroad (which is operated today by Seminole Gulf Railway) on the other side of the canal.

At Mullock Creek, another subsidiary, the Naples, Seaboard, and Gulf Railway, continued the line the rest of the way to Naples. From the creek, it headed southeast through Estero (just west of the Koreshan Unity Settlement) to Bonita Springs. In Bonita Springs, it turned south again before crossing the Imperial River. A passenger depot existed on the south side of Bonita Beach Road (near the site of First Presbyterian Church). The line then joined the current route of Goodlette-Frank Road near Vanderbilt Beach and headed into downtown Naples, terminating at the Naples passenger depot on Fifth Avenue South. President Warfield had hoped to build a deep-water port in Naples, which was never built.

In addition to the main route, two branches existed from Fort Myers to LaBelle and Punta Rassa. The thirty-mile LaBelle branch began just south of the Fort Myers freight depot and ran just south of Michigan Avenue before turning northeast and continuing just south of and parallel to State Road 80. It terminated in downtown LaBelle at a depot at Main Street and Seminole Avenue. In the 1940s, a seven-mile spur was built from the LaBelle branch southeast to Buckingham Army Airfield. The 8-mile Punta Rassa branch departed the main line just south of Fort Myers near the Six Mile Cypress Slough. Despite its name, the branch never fully reached Punta Rassa, where President Warfield had also hoped to establish a deep-water port. It actually terminated in Truckland near Iona, just two miles short of Punta Rassa. The branch ran from the main route west along the current route of Six Mile Cypress Parkway, through the center of today's Lakes Park (south of and parallel to the park's scenic boardwalk), then southwest along the current routes of Summerlin Road and Pine Ridge Road before turning back north slightly to its terminus at McGregor Boulevard in Truckland. The Punta Rassa branch ended up mostly serving agricultural land and gladiolus fields near Biggar. Power transmission line easements run on some of the former right of way of both the Labelle and Punta Rassa Branches.  

When the line and branches were complete, the Seaboard Air Line designated them as the Fort Myers Subdivision, LaBelle Subdivision, and Punta Rassa Subdivision.  After opening, the Seaboard's Orange Blossom Special and West Coast Limited provided daily passenger service down the west coast. Mixed train service (both passenger cars and freight combined) was offered from Fort Myers to LaBelle.

Decline and abandonment
Unlike the east coast route, the west coast route was not as successful and would exist for less than thirty years. The Seaboard Air Line went bankrupt in 1930 after the collapse of the land boom and in 1931, service to Fort Myers and Naples was reduced to a mixed train that operated three days a week. In 1933, only six years after the line opened, passenger service was discontinued entirely on the West Coast. By 1942, the line was abandoned south of Punta Rassa Junction (located at present-day Six Mile Cypress Parkway's crossing of the Ten Mile Canal in South Fort Myers). The southernmost seven miles of the right of way from Vanderbilt to downtown Naples and the Naples depot ended up being sold to the Atlantic Coast Line Railroad. The Atlantic Coast Line subsequently abandoned their branch to Marco Island south of Vanderbilt and extended the remaining line down the former Seaboard right of way to the passenger depot. This segment would remain in freight service until 1979.

The west coast SAL route was abandoned and removed by 1952. At this point, the SAL terminated its passenger service that ran east from Tampa to Edison (east of present-day Keysville) then south to Hull (south of Arcadia), and then to Fort Myers. The Atlantic Coast Line also reconstructed the first mile and a half of the Punta Rassa branch from their main line in the 1960s to briefly serve a rock mine just east of the Tamiami Trail (US 41) (site of Lakes Park). 

Some of the former right of way is now an unpaved trail called "Seaboard Grade" through the Fred C. Babcock/Cecil M. Webb Wildlife Management Area in southeastern Charlotte County.  One of the railroad's water towers still stands along Seaboard Grade.  In Fort Myers, Seaboard Street and Palm Avenue run along the former right of way. The John Yarbrough Linear Park runs close to the line's former right of way next to the Ten Mile Canal south of Fort Myers.  A FPL transmission line runs on most of the former route from Mullock Creek to Vanderbilt Beach, and Goodlette-Frank Road still run the rest of the right of way from there to downtown Naples. 

A few structures from the line remain. The Naples depot on Fifth Avenue South is now the home of a historical museum. The Fort Myers passenger depot most recently housed the Reilly Brothers Construction company and was demolished in August 2020. The Fort Myers freight depot on Michigan Avenue most recently housed Gully's Discount Store Fixtures but is now vacant (the name "Ft. Myers Seaboard Freight Station" is faintly engraved on the side of the building).

Historic Stations

References

CSX Transportation lines
Defunct Florida railroads
Predecessors of the Seaboard Air Line Railroad
1927 establishments in Florida
Seaboard Air Line Railroad